Sorell Council is a local government body in Tasmania, situated in the south-east of the state. The Sorell local government area is classified as rural and has a population of 15,218, the major centres of the region include Dodges Ferry, Dunalley, Primrose Sands and the principal town of Sorell.

History and attributes
The Sorell Municipal Council was established on 1 January 1862, and the first council elected March 26 1862. Sorell is classified as rural, agricultural and very large under the Australian Classification of Local Governments.

Sorell was historically divided from Hobart, and relied on ferry transport until the construction of a causeway in 1872.

Marion Bay, on the council's east coast, was home to the Tasmanian Falls Festival, an annual music and arts festival held every New Year's Eve for 17 years between 2003 - 2019. Due to impacts of the COVID-19 pandemic, the festival did not continue beyond its 17th year.

Suburbs

See also
List of local government areas of Tasmania

References

External links
Sorell Council official website
Local Government Association Tasmania
Tasmanian Electoral Commission - local government

Local government areas of Tasmania
Sorell Council